Lingarajapuram (also spelled Lingarajapura) is a locality located in the north-eastern part of the city of Bangalore. It is bound by Kammanahalli, Hennur and HBR Layout. The Lingarajapuram Flyover, which acts one of the thoroughfares connecting the north-eastern suburbs with the city, witnesses bottleneck traffic congestion during peak hours.

References

External links

Neighbourhoods in Bangalore